The 1956 Washington State Cougars baseball team represented the Washington State College in the 1956 NCAA baseball season. The Cougars played their home games at Bailey Field. The team was coached by Buck Bailey in his 30th year as head coach at Washington State.

The Cougars won the District VIII to advance to the College World Series, where they were defeated by the New Hampshire Wildcats.

Roster

f

Schedule

|-
! style="" | Regular Season
|-

|-
! bgcolor="#DDDDFF" width="3%" | #
! bgcolor="#DDDDFF" width="7%" | Date
! bgcolor="#DDDDFF" width="14%" | Opponent
! bgcolor="#DDDDFF" width="25%" | Site/Stadium
! bgcolor="#DDDDFF" width="5%" | Score
! bgcolor="#DDDDFF" width="5%" | Overall Record
! bgcolor="#DDDDFF" width="5%" | PCC Record
|- align="center" bgcolor="#ffcccc"
| 1 || March 24 || vs  || Bengal Field • Lewiston, Idaho || 3–4 || 0–1 || 0–0
|- align="center" bgcolor="#ffcccc"
| 2 || March 24 || vs Oregon State || Bengal Field • Lewiston, Idaho || 3–4 || 0–2 || 0–0
|- align="center" bgcolor="#ccffcc"
| 3 || March 30 || at  || Unknown • Walla Walla, Washington || – || 1–2 || 0–0
|- align="center" bgcolor="#ccffcc"
| 4 || March 31 || at Washington State Penitentiary || Unknown • Walla Walla, Washington || – || 2–2 || 0–0
|-

|-
! bgcolor="#DDDDFF" width="3%" | #
! bgcolor="#DDDDFF" width="7%" | Date
! bgcolor="#DDDDFF" width="14%" | Opponent
! bgcolor="#DDDDFF" width="25%" | Site/Stadium
! bgcolor="#DDDDFF" width="5%" | Score
! bgcolor="#DDDDFF" width="5%" | Overall Record
! bgcolor="#DDDDFF" width="5%" | PCC Record
|- align="center" bgcolor="#ccffcc"
| 10 || April 10 || Whitman || Bailey Field • Pullman, Washington || 6–1 || 7–3 || 0–0
|- align="center" bgcolor="#ccffcc"
| 11 || April 10 || Whitman || Bailey Field • Pullman, Washington || 4–0 || 8–3 || 0–0
|- align="center" bgcolor="#ccffcc"
| 12 || April 14 || Yakima || Bailey Field • Pullman, Washington || 5–1 || 9–3 || 0–0
|- align="center" bgcolor="#ccffcc"
| 13 || April 14 || Yakima || Bailey Field • Pullman, Washington || 3–2 || 10–3 || 0–0
|- align="center" bgcolor="#ccffcc"
| 14 || April 17 ||  || Bailey Field • Pullman, Washington || 4–0 || 11–3 || 0–0
|- align="center" bgcolor="#ccffcc"
| 15 || April 17 || Gonzaga || Bailey Field • Pullman, Washington || 17–7 || 12–3 || 0–0
|- align="center" bgcolor="#ccffcc"
| 16 || April 20 ||  || Bailey Field • Pullman, Washington || 8–2 || 13–3 || 0–0
|- align="center" bgcolor="#ccffcc"
| 17 || April 20 || Eastern Washington || Bailey Field • Pullman, Washington || 7–3 || 14–3 || 0–0
|- align="center" bgcolor="#ccffcc"
| 18 || April 23 ||  || Bailey Field • Pullman, Washington || 8–7 || 15–3 || 1–0
|- align="center" bgcolor="#ccffcc"
| 19 || April 24 || Washington || Bailey Field • Pullman, Washington || 9–2 || 16–3 || 2–0
|- align="center" bgcolor="#ccffcc"
| 20 || April 27 || at Washington || Graves Field • Seattle, Washington || 7–3 || 17–3 || 3–0
|- align="center" bgcolor="#ccffcc"
| 21 || April 28 || at Washington || Graves Field • Seattle, Washington || 18–1 || 18–3 || 4–0
|- align="center" bgcolor="#ccffcc"
| 22 || April 30 || at Oregon State || Coleman Field • Corvallis, Oregon || 7–5 || 19–3 || 5–0
|-

|-
! bgcolor="#DDDDFF" width="3%" | #
! bgcolor="#DDDDFF" width="7%" | Date
! bgcolor="#DDDDFF" width="14%" | Opponent
! bgcolor="#DDDDFF" width="25%" | Site/Stadium
! bgcolor="#DDDDFF" width="5%" | Score
! bgcolor="#DDDDFF" width="5%" | Overall Record
! bgcolor="#DDDDFF" width="5%" | PCC Record
|- align="center" bgcolor="#ccffcc"
| 23 || May 1 || at Oregon State || Coleman Field • Corvallis, Oregon || 12–6 || 20–3 || 6–0
|- align="center" bgcolor="#ccffcc"
| 24 || May 2 || at  || Howe Field • Eugene, Oregon || 10–4 || 21–3 || 7–0
|- align="center" bgcolor="#ffcccc"
| 25 || May 3 || Oregon || Bailey Field • Pullman, Washington || 9–13 || 21–4 || 7–1
|- align="center" bgcolor="#ffcccc"
| 26 || May 7 ||  || Bailey Field • Pullman, Washington || 1–2 || 21–5 || 7–2
|- align="center" bgcolor="#ccffcc"
| 27 || May 14 || Oregon State || Bailey Field • Pullman, Washington || 4–0 || 22–5 || 8–2
|- align="center" bgcolor="#ccffcc"
| 28 || May 15 || Oregon State || Bailey Field • Pullman, Washington || 9–3 || 23–5 || 9–2
|- align="center" bgcolor="#ccffcc"
| 29 || May 18 || Oregon || Bailey Field • Pullman, Washington || 8–6 || 24–5 || 10–2
|- align="center" bgcolor="#ffcccc"
| 30 || May 19 || Oregon || Bailey Field • Pullman, Washington || 2–4 || 24–6 || 10–3
|- align="center" bgcolor="#ccffcc"
| 31 || May 26 || at Idaho || MacLean Field • Moscow, Idaho || 1–2 || 25–6 || 11–3
|-

|-
! style="" | Postseason
|-

|-
! bgcolor="#DDDDFF" width="3%" | #
! bgcolor="#DDDDFF" width="7%" | Date
! bgcolor="#DDDDFF" width="14%" | Opponent
! bgcolor="#DDDDFF" width="25%" | Site/Stadium
! bgcolor="#DDDDFF" width="5%" | Score
! bgcolor="#DDDDFF" width="5%" | Overall Record
! bgcolor="#DDDDFF" width="5%" | PCC Record
|- align="center" bgcolor="#ccffcc"
| 33 || June 1 || vs  || Bailey Field • Pullman, Washington || 6–2 || 27–6 || 11–3
|- align="center" bgcolor="#ccffcc"
| 34 || June 2 || vs Southern California || Bailey Field • Pullman, Washington || 5–4 || 28–6 || 11–3
|-

|-
! bgcolor="#DDDDFF" width="3%" | #
! bgcolor="#DDDDFF" width="7%" | Date
! bgcolor="#DDDDFF" width="14%" | Opponent
! bgcolor="#DDDDFF" width="25%" | Site/Stadium
! bgcolor="#DDDDFF" width="5%" | Score
! bgcolor="#DDDDFF" width="5%" | Overall Record
! bgcolor="#DDDDFF" width="5%" | PCC Record
|- align="center" bgcolor="#ffcccc"
| 35 || June 9 || vs Bradley || Johnny Rosenblatt Stadium • Omaha, Nebraska || 3–4 || 28–7 || 11–3
|- align="center" bgcolor="#ffcccc"
| 36 || June 10 || vs New Hampshire || Johnny Rosenblatt Stadium • Omaha, Nebraska || 4–6 || 28–8 || 11–3
|-

|-
|

Awards and honors 
Ron Aiken
First Team All-District VIII

Bill Rich
Third Team All-American
First Team All-District VIII

References

Washington State Cougars baseball seasons
Washington State Cougars baseball
College World Series seasons
Washington State
Pac-12 Conference baseball champion seasons